Yeso may refer to:

Yeso, New Mexico, an unincorporated community
Yeso Creek, a stream in New Mexico
Yeso Formation, a geological formation in New Mexico
Yeso River, a river in Chile
Ezo, a region of Japan (as variant spelling)

See also
Ezo (disambiguation)